Como un relámpago is a 1996 Spanish film directed by Miguel Hermoso. It received the Colón de Oro award. Santiago Ramos was awarded the Goya Award for Best Actor for his performance.

Synopsis 
Pablo (Eloy Azorín), an upper class teenager, lives with his mother Sonia (Assumpta Serna). One day he decides to look for Rafael (Santiago Ramos), his father, who abandoned them in his childhood. Thanks to his neighbor, he discovers that he lives in Gran Canaria, and he does not hesitate to pay him a visit.

Cast 

 Santiago Ramos — Rafael Torres
 Eloy Azorín — Pablo
 Assumpta Serna — Sonia Peña

Awards 

 Goya Award for Best Actor for Santiago Ramos.
 Colón de Oro of the Ibero-American Film Festival of Huelva.

References 

Spanish comedy films